The Breda A.8 was a prototype twin-engined biplane, designed by Società Italiana Ernesto Breda, as a night bomber in 1927.

Design and development
The A.8, designed as an improvement to the Breda A.3, was modified to rectify problems experienced with the A.3. When the aircraft was tested using two  Lorraine-Dietrich 12Db engines, the results were quite modest. In response, the designers changed to  Isotta Fraschini Asso 500 engines, but the performance was still disappointing and the design was abandoned.

Specifications

References

Further reading

A.8
1920s Italian bomber aircraft
Biplanes
Aircraft first flown in 1927